Canton Lake is a lake in Blaine and Dewey Counties in Oklahoma, near Longdale and Canton. Its main source of water is the North Canadian River. It is about an hour away from Enid. The lake serves as a municipal water supply reservoir for Oklahoma City, which pays to have water released from the lake for water-supply purposes.

Canton Dam was a 1948 project of the Southwestern Division of the United States Army Corps of Engineers. Canton is owned and operated by the Army Corps of Engineers but Oklahoma City retains the storage rights.

The lake is home to several species of fish, including largemouth bass, white bass, channel catfish, crappie, and walleye. Canton has become the primary source of walleye eggs for incubation and stocking of other state lakes. Since 1968, community leaders and local merchants have promoted an annual Walleye Rodeo.  The four-day event offers visitors the chance to win cash and other prizes that total over $30,000.

Facilities at the lake include boat ramps, picnic areas, RV and tent campsites, drinking water, group shelters, restrooms, showers, a swimming beach, concession services, and a nature trail.

In early 2013, Oklahoma City officials diverted 30,000 acre-ft of water from Canton Lake to Lake Hefner, to replenish the city's water supply. Later, spring rains replenished the level of that lake, which had to dump water into the North Canadian River to prevent the lake from overflowing. This has contributed to an algae bloom.

In April 2016, the lake finally replenished from the 2013 water diversion Oklahoma City made.

In August 2022, Oklahoma City officials have requested a water release from Canton Lake to replenish Lake Hefner.

References

External links
 Canton Lake information and photos on TravelOK.com Official Oklahoma Tourism & Recreation Department website
 Canton Lake information and data on usace.army.mil Official U.S. Army Corps of Engineers website for Canton Lake
 Oklahoma Digital Maps: Digital Collections of Oklahoma and Indian Territory

Bodies of water of Blaine County, Oklahoma
Bodies of water of Dewey County, Oklahoma
Lakes of Oklahoma
Tourist attractions in Blaine County, Oklahoma
Tourist attractions in Dewey County, Oklahoma